Jetsun Lobsang Tenzin Rinpoche (1937 – 21 April 2017) was the 103rd Ganden Tripa (spiritual leader) of the Gelug school of Tibetan Buddhism. He was appointed to the position by the Dalai Lama in 2016 and died in 2017.

References 

1937 births
2017 deaths
Ganden Tripas
Gelug Lamas
Lamas from Tibet